Eusimonia is a genus of karschiid camel spiders, first described by Karl Kraepelin in 1899.

Species 
, the World Solifugae Catalog accepts the following fifteen species:

 Eusimonia arabica Roewer, 1933 — Yemen
 Eusimonia cornigera Panouse, 1955 — Morocco
 Eusimonia divina Birula, 1935 — Afghanistan, Iran, Kazakhstan, Turkmenistan, Uzbekistan
 Eusimonia fagei Panouse, 1956 — Morocco
 Eusimonia furcillata (Simon, 1872) — Cyprus, Israel, Syria
 Eusimonia kabiliana (Simon, 1879) — Algeria, Egypt, Israel
 Eusimonia mirabilis Roewer, 1933 — Libya, Morocco
 Eusimonia nigrescens Kraepelin, 1899 — Greece, Syria, Turkey
 Eusimonia orthoplax Kraepelin, 1899 — Algeria
 Eusimonia roeweri Panouse, 1957 — Morocco
 Eusimonia seistanica Roewer, 1933 — Iran
 Eusimonia serrifera Birula, 1905 — Iran
 Eusimonia turkestana Kraepelin, 1899 — China, Kazakhstan, Mongolia
 Eusimonia walsinghami (Hirst, 1910) — Algeria
 Eusimonia wunderlichi Pieper, 1977 — Spain

References 

Arachnid genera
Solifugae